The 1960 United States presidential election in Oklahoma took place on November 8, 1960, as part of the 1960 United States presidential election. Voters chose eight representatives, or electors, to the Electoral College, who voted for president and vice president.

Oklahoma was won by incumbent Vice President Richard Nixon (R–California), running with United States Ambassador to the United Nations Henry Cabot Lodge, Jr., with 59.02% of the popular vote, against Senator John F. Kennedy (D–Massachusetts), running with Senator Lyndon B. Johnson, with 40.98% of the popular vote. In the Electoral College, Nixon received seven of Oklahoma's eight electoral votes; the eighth was cast by a faithless elector for Harry F. Byrd of Virginia.

With 59.02% of the popular vote, Oklahoma would prove to be Nixon's third strongest state in 1960 after Nebraska and Kansas. This election marked the first time since statehood that a Democrat won the presidency without carrying Oklahoma.

Results

Results by county

See also
 United States presidential elections in Oklahoma

References

Oklahoma
1960
1960 Oklahoma elections